Expeditie Robinson: 2002, was the third Dutch/Belgian version of the Swedish show Expedition Robinson, or Survivor as it is referred to in some countries. This season began airing on September 15, 2002 and concluded on December 18, 2002. The major twist this season was that the team tribes were divided up by gender with the Mensirip tribe initially being only men, while the Uma tribe was initially only women. Another twist occurred in episode 3 when the first ever tribal swap took place. Ultimately, it was Derek Blok from the Netherlands who won the season over Olivier Glorieux from Belgium with a close jury vote of 5-4.

Finishing order

Future Appearances
Jakobien Huisman and Lydia Guiso returned to compete in Expeditie Robinson: Battle of the Titans.

Voting history

 As Raymond voluntarily left the competition in episode 5, no one was eliminated at the fifth tribal council.

 As Keo was evacuated in episode 6, no one was eliminated at the sixth tribal council.

External links
http://worldofbigbrother.com/Survivor/BN/3/about.shtml
https://web.archive.org/web/20100824005632/http://www.expeditie-robinson.tv/vorigeseizoenen/expeditierobinson2002/

Expeditie Robinson seasons
2002 Dutch television seasons
2002 Belgian television seasons